Puerto Rican rapper Daddy Yankee has won 157 awards from 518 nominations. He has been nominated for 80 Billboard Latin Music Awards, 28 Latin Grammy Awards, 25 Latin American Music Awards, 15 Billboard Music Awards, 9 American Music Awards, and 5 Grammy Awards. He has received 30 Billboard Latin Music Awards, 8 Billboard Music Awards, the most by any Latin artist, 6 Latin Grammy Awards, 4 Latin American Music Awards, and 3 American Music Awards. Awarded 2 iHeartRadio Music Awards along with the accomplishment of reaching 1 Billion Total Audience Spins for “Despacito”. He was recognized with the Latin Songwriter of the Year award from the American Society of Composers, Authors and Publishers four times and became the first urban artist to receive his own star at the Puerto Rican Walk of Fame sidewalk and to be inducted into the Billboard Latin Music Hall of Fame. His career was also recognized with the Lo Nuestro Lifetime Achievement Award and other honours given by the Hispanic Heritage Foundation and the World Boxing Council.

Daddy Yankee rose to prominence with the release of his third studio album, Barrio Fino (2004), which garnered him a Latin Grammy Award for Best Urban Music Album. The lead single, "Gasolina", became the first reggaeton song to receive a nomination for a Latin Grammy Award for Record of the Year. Following the success of Barrio Fino, Daddy Yankee released the studio albums El Cartel: The Big Boss (2007), Mundial (2010), and Prestige (2012), the live album Barrio Fino en Directo (2005), the soundtrack Talento de Barrio (2008), and the mixtape King Daddy (2013). All of these were nominated for Latin Grammy Awards for Best Urban Music Album, while El Cartel: The Big Boss received a Grammy Award nomination. During this time, his singles "Impacto" (2007), "Llamado de Emergencia" (2008), "Grito Mundial" (2009), "Descontrol" (2010), "Ven Conmigo", "Lovumba" (both 2011), and "Limbo" (2012), as well as his guest feature on Miguelito's "Al Son del Boom" (2007), were nominated for Latin Grammy Awards for Best Urban Song.

His guest feature on Luis Fonsi's "Despacito" (2017) garnered him four Latin Grammy Awards, including Record and Song of the Year, as well as three Grammy Award nominations, also including Record and Song of the Year. It also received five Billboard Music Awards, including Top Hot 100 Song, and six Billboard Latin Music Awards.  Between 2015 and 2020, "Sígueme y Te Sigo" (2015), "Yo Contra Ti" (2017), "Dura" (2018), and "Con Calma" (2019), as well as his guest features on Cosculluela's "A Donde Voy" (2016) and Anuel AA's "China" (2019), were nominated for Latin Grammy Awards, with "Dura" garnering his first and only win for Best Urban Song. He also won a Billboard Music Award for Top Latin Song for "Con Calma". His final album, Legendaddy (2022), was nominated for a Grammy Award for Best Música Urbana Album, while its single "Agua" garnered him his second Latin Grammy Award for Song of the Year nomination. He will retire from music in 2023 after the end of his farewell concert tour.

Notes

References 

Awards
Daddy Yankee